is a city in Aichi Prefecture, Japan. , the city had an estimated population of 72,864 in 29,139 households, and a population density of 1,986 persons per km2.

Geography

Hekinan is located in south-central Aichi Prefecture, and is surrounded by Lake Aburagafuchi, the Yahagi River, Kinuura Bay, and Mikawa Bay. Most of the city area lies on reclaimed ground, with an average elevation of under seven meters above sea level.

Climate
The city has a climate characterized by hot and humid summers, and relatively mild winters (Köppen climate classification Cfa).  The average annual temperature in Hekinan is 15.7 °C. The average annual rainfall is 1609 mm with September as the wettest month. The temperatures are highest on average in August, at around 27.6 °C, and lowest in January, at around 4.6 °C.

Gamagōri, Aichi is the closet point that measures climate information.

Demographics
Per Japanese census data, the population of Hekinan has been increasing steadily over the past 50 years.

Surrounding municipalities
Aichi Prefecture
Anjō
Takahama
Nishio

History

Ancient history
The area is part of ancient Mikawa Province.

Early modern period
Under then Edo period, Tokugawa Shogunate, much of what is now Hekinan was part of the holdings of Numazu Domain, with the remainder being tenryō territory under direct control of the shogunate.

Late modern period
Widespread rioting occurred in the area against the new Meiji government and its policy of shinbutsu bunri in 1871.
The area was organized into towns and villages within Hekikai District by the Meiji period establishment of the modern municipalities system in 1889.

Contemporary history
Showa period
The towns of Ohama, Shinkawa and Tanao, and the village of Asahi merged on April 5, 1948, to form the city of Hekinan As it is located on the southern (南) part of Hekikai District (碧海郡), the city was named .
Hekinan was the tenth city founded in Aichi Prefecture. Since it had harbors and rails, the city developed quickly after Pacific War.

On April 1, 1955, one part of the village of Meiji, which is currently called Nishibata, was incorporated into Hekinan.

On September 26, 1959, Typhoon Vera also known as the "Isewan Typhoon" heavily damaged the city.

On July 14, 1974, Rinkai Kōen Pool or also known as Kinuura Mammoth Pool was opened.

Because the city reclaimed the seaside for industrial purposes in 1960's, Hekinan opened this pool for people who complained about losing their beautiful beach.

On May 23, 1988, Hekinan Municipal Hospital was opened.
Heisei period
In 1993, Hekinan Thermal Power Station was created by Chubu Electric Power on the reclaimed ground.
This provides high tax revenue to the city.
On August 17, 2003, since the facility of the Rinkai Kōen Pool became old and the number of the visitors of the pool was reduced, the city shut down the pool.
Instead, the city created Hekinan Rinkai Park on the same place.

Government

Hekinan has a mayor-council form of government with a directly elected mayor and a unicameral city legislature of 22 members, which is considerably higher than other cities of similar size. The city contributes one member to the Aichi Prefectural Assembly.  In terms of national politics, the city is part of Aichi District 13 of the lower house of the Diet of Japan.

Economy
Hekinan is one of the wealthiest cities in Japan. Its financial capability index is 1.70. Automobile-related components, metal, tile, and food processing are the main industries in the city. In 2006 the number of factories was 463 with 16,778 workers. The value of shipments was 84,356,533 million yen in total in 2006. The Hekinan Thermal Power Station is one of largest thermal power plants in the world.

Primary sector of the economy

Agriculture
Even though only 4% of the population of Hekinan engage in agriculture, one-quarter of the area is farmland. The main products are carrots, onions, potatoes and figs. Anjo and Hekinan are the largest producer of figs in Japan.

Secondary sector of the economy

Manufacturing
Automobile
In 2010, there were 9,148 people working in this industry, shipping products worth 47,058,959 yen which is more than half of the amount of shipments in the city. Toyota Industries is the biggest company for the industry in the city. There were 1,722 Toyota employees in Hekinan, or about 10% of the total industrial workers in the city in 2010.
Ceramic tile
One remarkable industry in the city is related to ceramic roofing tiles. Hekinan is one of the cities that produce Sanshu kawara, a well-known regional brand. In Japan, 58 per cent of tiles, which is about 50,000,000 tiles, are Sanshu kawara.

Education
Hekinan has seven public elementary schools and five public junior high schools operated by the city government, and two public high schools operated by the Aichi Prefectural Board of Education. The prefecture also operates one special education school for the handicapped.

High schools
Hekinan High School
Hekinan Technical High School

Middle schools
Hekinan Shinkawa Middle School
Hekinan Chūō Middle School
Hekinan Nishibata Middle School
Hekinan Higashi Middle School
Hekinan Minami Middle School

Elementary schools
Hekinan Ōhama Elementary School
Hekinan Shinkawa Elementary School
Hekinan Tanao Elementary School
Hekinan Chūō Elementary School
Hekinan Nishibata Elementary School
Hekinan Nisshin Elementary School
Hekinan Washizuka Elementary School

International schools
 Escola Alegria de Saber (エスコーラ・アレグリア・デ・サベール) – Brazilian school (Ensinos Fundamental e Médio)

Transportation

Railway
 Meitetsu
Meitetsu Mikawa Line：（Takahama）-  –  –  – （Terminus）
 Kinuura Rinkai Railway
Hekinan Line：（Takahama）-  – （Terminus）

Roads

Japan National Route

Prefectural road
Aichi Prefectural road 43
Aichi Prefectural road 45
Aichi Prefectural road 46
Aichi Prefectural road 50
Aichi Prefectural road 265
Aichi Prefectural road 291
Aichi Prefectural road 295
Aichi Prefectural road 301
Aichi Prefectural road 302
Aichi Prefectural road 303
Aichi Prefectural road 304
Aichi Prefectural road 305
Aichi Prefectural road 306
Aichi Prefectural road 307

Seaways

Seaport
Kinuura Bay Port
Ohama Port
Shinkawa Port

External relations

Twin towns – sister cities

Hekinan is twinned with:

International
Edmonds（Washington, United States of America）
since April 5, 1988
To build Hekinan citizen's international sensibility, the city was looking for a sister city relationship with a city in the Pacific Ocean coast. At the same time, Edmonds considered to have the relationship with one of Japanese cities. Edmonds sent officials to Hekinan in 1986. The two cities started exchanging people for home stay. Two years later, at the ceremony of 40th anniversary of Hekinan, the two cities established a sister-cities relationship.
Events between Hekinan and Edmonds
 On April 5, 1988, Hekinan and Edmonds established a sister city relationship.
 In 1998, the Hekinan city hall hosted the sculpture by Steve Jensen to celebrate 10th anniversary of the relationships.
 In 2004, Twenty five Hekinan artists, residents, and officials visited Edmonds to dedicate the Friendship Tree on the Edmonds waterfront.
 In 2008, Mayor Gary Haakenson visited Hekinan with 18 citizens to celebrate 20th anniversary

Pula（Istria County, Croatia）
since April 5, 2005.
In April 2005, the Deputy Prime Minister of Croatia visited to Hekinan to participate in Expo 2005. During the stay, the Vice Prime Minister proposed to have a sister cities relationships between Croatian cities. Hekinan sent officials to Pula in 2006. On April 5, 2007, Hekinan invited the Mayor of Pula for the 59th anniversary and established a sister city relationship between the two cities.

National
Yuni（Sorachi Subprefecture, Hokkaido）
since April 5, 1988
About 20 people from Hekikaigun moved to Yuni, Mikawa. Since the sounds of the regions were the same, they developed this region very well. This connection made two cities have the sister city relationship at the same date that Edmonds signed the relationship between Hekinan.
Toyota（Aichi Prefecture, Chūbu region）
since April 5, 1992

Local attractions
Hekinan Rinkai park
Hekinan Sea Side Aquarium (碧南海浜水族館)
Hekinan Rinkai Gym
Hekinan Rinkai park ground
Aoi park
Mugaen – Philosophy Taiken Village
Akashi Park
Hekinan Tatsukichi Fujii Museum of Contemporary Art
Myōfuku-ji (妙福寺/志貴毘沙門天)
Shōmyō-ji – A temple related to Tokugawa Ieyasu.

Culture

Festivals
Various festivals are held throughout the year in Hekinan.

Notable people from Hekinan 
Hideaki Ōmura, politician
Kenzo Suzuki, professional wrestler

Notes

References

External links

  
 Hekinan City official website 
 Hekinan Rinkai Park 
 Hekinan city Tatsukichi Fujii Museum of Contemporary Art 
 Hekinan Akashi Park 
 Mugaen 

Cities in Aichi Prefecture
Port settlements in Japan
Populated coastal places in Japan
Hekinan, Aichi